Umberto Lungavia (24 February 1901 – 13 September 1970) was an Italian water polo player. He competed in the men's tournament at the 1920 Summer Olympics.

References

External links
 

1901 births
1970 deaths
Italian male water polo players
Olympic water polo players of Italy
Water polo players at the 1920 Summer Olympics
Water polo players from Genoa